Jack Raymond (1886–1953) was an English actor and film director. Born in Wimborne, Dorset in 1886, he began acting before the First World War in A Detective for a Day. In 1921 he directed his first film and gradually he wound down his acting to concentrate completely on directing - making more than forty films in total before his death in 1953.

He was associated with the Hepworth Studios of Walton on Thames, since his portrait appears on a studio publicity postcard when he was probably in his early twenties.

He had a major success in 1930 with The Great Game, one of the earliest films devoted to football and followed it up with Up for the Cup a year later. He remade Up for the Cup in 1950.

Partial filmography

Director

The Vicar of Wakefield (1913)
Red, White and Blue Blood (1917)
The English Rose (1920)
The Flat (1921)
A Woman Misunderstood (1921)
Tilly of Bloomsbury (1921)
The Curse of Westacott (1921)
Second to None (1927)
Lonesome (1928)
Sally of the Scandals (1928)
Three Weekends (1928)
A Peep Behind the Scenes (1929)
Splinters (1929)
The Great Game (1930)
Mischief (1931)
Almost a Divorce (1931)
Tilly of Bloomsbury (1931)
Up for the Cup (1931)
Life Goes On (1932)
Say It with Music (1932)
Up to the Neck (1933)
It's a King (1933)
Night of the Garter (1933)
Girls, Please! (1934)
Come Out of the Pantry (1935)
Where's George? (1935)
Streamline Express (1935)
The Preview Murder Mystery (1936)
Talk of the Devil (1936)
When Knights Were Bold (1936)
Chick (1936, producer)
The Frog (1937)
Blondes for Danger (1938)
A Royal Divorce (1938)
You Will Remember (1941)
Up for the Cup (1950)
Take Me to Paris (1951)
Reluctant Heroes (1951)

Actor
The Vicar of Wakefield (1913) - Moses Primrose
The Lights of Home (1920) - Mark
The English Rose (1920)
His Other Wife (1921) - Dick Riviere
The Dinkum Bloke (1923) - John Gilder
Dope (1924)
The Only Way (1925) - Jacques
Up for the Cup (1931) - Railway clerk (final film role)

References

1886 births
1953 deaths
English male film actors
English film directors
Burials at Forest Lawn Memorial Park (Glendale)
People from Wimborne Minster
20th-century English male actors